"Trouble Blues" is a 1949 single by The Charles Brown Trio.  The single was the most successful of the trio's career and peaked at number one on the R&B chart for fifteen weeks.  At fifteen weeks on the R&B Best Sellers chart, "Trouble Blues" was the most successful R&B song of the year.

Brown re-recorded the song for his 1972 Blues 'n' Brown album.

References

1949 singles
Charles Brown (musician) songs
Blues songs
Aladdin Records singles
1949 songs